The deepwater sculpin (Myoxocephalus thompsonii) is a species of freshwater fish in the family Cottidae of order Scorpaeniformes. It is a glacial relict, native to a limited number of deep, cold lakes in Canada and the United States.

The deepwater sculpin was first described in 1851 by Charles Frédéric Girard under the name Triglopsis thompsonii. The description was based on specimens obtained by Spencer Fullerton Baird for the Smithsonian Institution from the stomachs of Burbot caught by fishermen on Lake Ontario. The name Triglopsis referred to its resemblance to the Piper gurnard. The specific epithet honored fellow naturalist Rev. Zadock Thompson of Burlington, Vermont.

The similarity between this species and the Fourhorn sculpin led to some taxonomic discussion. Some authors considered it a subspecies (Myoxocephalus quadricornis thompsonii), while other authors maintained it as a species within the same genus (Myoxocephalus thompsonii). Mitochondrial DNA analysis was able to establish that the two species were distinct while providing additional support for the proposal that the deepwater sculpin evolved from the fourhorn sculpin during the early Pleistocene era.

It does not have true scales. Spines are present on the body and fins. The skin is mottled green, gray and brown on the back and whitish underneath. The deepwater sculpin can be distinguished from other freshwater sculpins in its range by a distinct gap between the two dorsal fins. It is most similar in appearance to the fourhorn sculpin, a fish found in salt and brackish water in the arctic but lacks the four bony spines found on the head of that species.
 
The deepwater sculpin is found from the Gatineau through the Great Lakes, Manitoba, and Saskatchewan to the Great Slave and Great Bear Lakes. It is also found in Waterton Lake within Waterton Lakes National Park and Glacier National Park. Within its range, it is limited to deep, well oxygenated lakes with ties to former Wisconsinan glacial lakes or the Champlain Sea. 

The deepwater sculpin inhabits the demersal zone. In lakes in the southern part of its range, it has been observed only in deep water where the water temperature remains cold year round. 

The deepwater sculpin feeds primarily on small crustaceans Mysis diluviana and Diporeia. They will also take chironomid larvae. Zooplankton are the likely food of the larval stage.

Deepwater sculpin eggs hatch from November to August, peaking in March. Larvae are initially pelagic, staying in the water column above the reach of their adults. Beginning in July, larvae that have grown to  go through metamorphosis and settle to the bottom. Fish are thought to reach maturity at three years for females and two years for males.

Deepwater sculpin are a significant food source for other fish including lake trout (Salvelinus namaycush) and burbot (Lota lota). They are an intermediate host for the parasites Bothriocephalus cuspidatus, and Proteocephalus sp. which also are found in the crustaceans they eat and the fish species that prey on them. 

The deepwater sculpin is an indicator species for the health of the deepwater communities in the lakes where it occurs. It is of special interest to those interested in zoogeography.

The deepwater sculpin is classified as of Least Concern by the IUCN based on the apparent stability of the population. In Canada, it is considered a species at risk under the Species at Risk Act. Threats include habitat loss, lake eutrophication, invasive species, and water pollution.

References

External Links
Deepwater sculpin (Myoxocephalus thompsonii) management plan, Species at Risk, Government of Canada

Fish of the Great Lakes
Fish described in 1851
Myoxocephalus